Jonas Björkman and Byron Black were the defending champions, but Black did not compete this year. Björkman teamed up with David Prinosil and lost in semifinals to tournament winners Jiří Novák and David Rikl.

Jiří Novák and David Rikl won the title by defeating Donald Johnson and Piet Norval 3–6, 6–3, 6–4 in the final.

Seeds
All seeds receive a bye into the second round.

Draw

Finals

Top half

Bottom half

References
 Main Draw (ATP)

Doubles